WIRD (920 AM) was a radio station broadcasting an Adult Standards/MOR format, simulcasting sister station WNBZ. Licensed to Lake Placid, New York, United States, the station was owned by Radio Lake Placid, Inc. and featured programming from ABC Radio.

The station went on the air November 21, 1961. WIRD's license was canceled on May 24, 2017, for failure to pay debt it owed to the Federal Communications Commission (FCC), which prevented the station's license from being renewed. Shortly after the cancellation, on June 21, 2017, the Adirondack Daily Enterprise reported that WIRD has been off the air for at least two years.

References

External links
FCC Search Details: DWIRD (Facility ID: 54652)
 (covering 1959-1981)

IRD
Radio stations established in 1961
1961 establishments in New York (state)
Radio stations disestablished in 2017
2017 disestablishments in New York (state)
Defunct radio stations in the United States
IRD